The 3rd Colonial Infantry Division was a division of the French Marine Forces, comprising mostly French citizen troops. 

The 3rd Colonial Infantry Division fought in the First and Second world wars.

World War I

Composition
1er Régiment d'infanterie coloniale August 1914
2e Régiment d'infanterie coloniale August 1914
3e Régiment d'infanterie coloniale August 1914 - February 1916
7e régiment d'infanterie coloniale August 1914 - November 1918
21e Régiment d'infanterie coloniale August 1914 - November 1918
23e régiment d'infanterie coloniale end of 1914 - November 1918
58e régiment d'infanterie coloniale du Sénégal June - October 1916
 1 Battalion of the 88e régiment d'infanterie territoriale August - November 1918

As part of the French 1st Colonial Corps, at various times it was part of the French First Army, French Second Army, French Third Army, French Fourth Army, French Fifth Army, French Sixth Army, French Seventh Army, French Eighth Army and French Tenth Army.

Engagements
1914: The division fought in the Battle of the Ardennes (where it lost roughly 11,000 men out of a contingent of 15,000), the Battle of the Meuse, the First Battle of the Marne and the First Battle of Champagne.
1915: Many small engagements, plus the Second Battle of Champagne.
1916: The Battle of the Somme (twice).
1917: The Second Battle of the Aisne, and many small engagements.
1918: The Third Battle of the Aisne, the 4th Battle of Champagne, the Second Battle of the Marne, and many minor engagements until the end of the war.

Organization in World War 2 
The structure of the division in World War II was as follows:

 Chief of Staff, 3rd Colonial Infantry Division
 Infantry Commander, 3rd Colonial Infantry Division
1st Colonial Infantry Regiment
21st Colonial Infantry Regiment
 23rd Colonial Infantry Regiment
 Artillery Commander, 3rd Infantry Division
3rd Colonial Divisional Artillery Regiment
 203rd Colonial Divisional Heavy Artillery Regiment

See also
 Troupes de marine
 Fusiliers de Marine - Naval light infantry
 French Colonial Forces

References

External links
Official site
 Unofficial site (managed by the national federation of veterans of oversea and marine troops)

Colonial, 3rd
Infantry divisions of France